The  was an army of the Imperial Japanese Army during the final days of World War II.

History

As part of the final defenses of the Philippines against invasion and re-occupation by Allied forces in the closing stages of World War II, Imperial General Headquarters issued orders for the strategic island of Luzon to be divided into three defense sectors for defense in depth under the overall command of the Japanese Fourteenth Area Army.

From December 17, 1944, Lieutenant General Shizuo Yokoyama and his “Shimbu Group”, an independent detachment, were made wholly responsible for the defense of southern Luzon, from Manila southwards. The Shimbu Group was officially re-designated the Japanese 41st Army on March 6, 1945. Yokoyama commanded Japanese forces defending Manila against the U.S. Sixth and Eighth Armies. Following the Battle of Manila, Yokohama withdraw his surviving forces into the mountains of southern Luzon for a protracted guerrilla campaign, continuing to harass Allied forces until the surrender of Japan, by which time his army had been reduced to just 6500 men.

List of Commanders

References

Sources

External links

41
Military units and formations established in 1944
Military units and formations disestablished in 1945